Bell & Spurling are an English comedy music duo, consisting of Martin Bell and Johnny Spurling. They formed in the 1990s, and are best known for the single, Sven, Sven, Sven, which reached number seven in the UK Singles Chart in October 2001. The song was inspired by the England football team's 5-1 victory against Germany, and contained recordings of Jonathan Pearce's commentary from that match. It mentions a number of contemporary England and German footballing figures and events, most notably Sven-Göran Eriksson, to whom the song title and refrain refer.

The pair now present their own radio show - The Bell & Spurling Show - on Love Sport Radio, every day from 10am until 1pm.

Music career
Martin Bell from Chigwell, and Johnny Spurling from Romford, were both session singers who became a duo. After carving out a career singing at parties for Rod Stewart and Simon Cowell, they went on to appear on London based radio stations such as Talksport and Capital FM with their stories and songs. Following their two pop hits Sven Sven Sven  and Goldenballs (Mr Beckham To You), the pair appeared on various television programmes, including a couple of appearances on Top of the Pops. Bell is still writing and performing with his band The Atlantic Band, as well as hosting corporate functions. Bell was also involved in the pilot episode for The Only Way Is Essex, but subsequently was pulled from the show. Spurling has appeared in the comedy film The Flirting Club. In June 2018 he  went to the Edinburgh Festival with the show Terry Alderton's All Crazy Now.

Bell has written and performed the song "Running Free" for the lead track in the critically condemned film "Run For Your Wife" starring Danny Dyer, based on the long-running West End show.

In 2018, ready for the World Cup in Russia the duo revamped their classic "Sven, Sven, Sven" and released "Gareth, Gareth, Gareth" onto the unsuspecting public. It was not a hit.

Discography

References

British comedy musical groups
English musical duos
English comedy duos